Yamamura (written: 山村 literally "mountain village") is a Japanese surname. Notable people with the surname include:

Yamamura Bochō (1884–1924), Japanese writer, poet and songwriter
Hajime Yamamura, Japanese manga artist and author of Kamunagara
Hibiku Yamamura (born 1988), Japanese voice actress and singer
, Japanese naval officer
Malia Yamamura, 1984 winner of the Miss Hawaii Teen USA contest
Kou Shibasaki (born Yukie Yamamura in 1981), Japanese singer and actress
Sakae Yamamura, 1982 winner of the IEEE Nikola Tesla Award
Yamamura Yoshihiro, member of the Japanese popular music group, Wyse
Kōji Yamamura (born 1964), Japanese animation director
Yamamura Ryuta (born 1985), flumpool vocalist
, Japanese footballer

Fictional characters 
Mikan Yamamura, a character from UFO Baby (Japanese title, Daa! Daa! Daa!) series 
Sadako Yamamura, the antagonist in Koji Suzuki's novel the Ring and film the Ring
Yamamura-sensei, a character from the Maria-sama ga Miteru series
Misao Yamamura, a character from the anime and manga series of Case Closed
Yamamura, a bird that appears in Super Mario Maker 2

Japanese-language surnames